John William Sheldrick (born 1939), is a male former athlete who competed for England.

Athletics career
He represented England and won a bronze medal in the discus at the 1962 British Empire and Commonwealth Games in Perth, Western Australia.

He was a member of the Thames Valley Club.

Personal life
During the Games he met his future wife Prue O'Connor and stayed in Australia, therefore officially emigrating. Together they had five sons.

References

1939 births
English male discus throwers
Commonwealth Games medallists in athletics
Commonwealth Games bronze medallists for England
Athletes (track and field) at the 1962 British Empire and Commonwealth Games
Living people
Medallists at the 1962 British Empire and Commonwealth Games